Wronin  is a village in the administrative district of Gmina Polska Cerekiew, within Kędzierzyn-Koźle County, Opole Voivodeship, in southern Poland.

The village has a population of 347.

The name of the village is of Polish origin and comes from the word wrona, which means "crow". In documents from 1294 and 1532 it was also mentioned under its Old Polish name Wronów.

References

Wronin